Caleb Jones (born January 9, 1980) is an American Republican politician. He served as member of the Missouri House of Representatives from the 50th District, being first elected for the 117th District in 2010.  He then served as Deputy Chief of Staff to Governor Eric Greitens in 2017. He is currently the CEO for Missouri Electric Cooperatives.

Biography 
Caleb grew up in rural Moniteau County, Missouri.  The son of a local Sheriff and school teacher, Caleb attending Clarksburg Elementary School and California High School.  He excelled in academics and sports as student body president, a member of the 1997 Missouri 3A Football Champions, the 1997 FFA Missouri State Star Farmer, as well as a member of Drama Club, National Honor Society, Show Choir and many other organizations.  After high school, Caleb attended the University of Missouri-Columbia majoring in Agricultural Economics in the College of Agriculture, Food and Natural Resources.

Electoral history

References

1980 births
Living people
Republican Party members of the Missouri House of Representatives
Place of birth missing (living people)
21st-century American politicians